An election boycott is the boycotting of an election by a group of voters, each of whom abstains from voting.

Boycotting may be used as a form of political protest where voters feel that electoral fraud is likely, or that the electoral system is biased against its candidates, that the polity organizing the election lacks legitimacy, or that the candidates running are very unpopular.  In jurisdictions with compulsory voting, a boycott may amount to an act of civil disobedience; alternatively, supporters of the boycott may be able to cast blank votes or vote for "none of the above".  Boycotting voters may belong to a particular regional or ethnic group.  A particular political party or candidate may refuse to run in the election and urges its supporters to boycott the vote.

In the case of a referendum, a boycott may be used as a voting tactic by opponents of the proposition.  If the referendum requires a minimum turnout to be valid, the boycott may prevent this quorum being reached.

In general elections, individuals and parties will often boycott in order to protest the ruling party's policies with the hope that when voters do not show up the elections will be deemed illegitimate by outside observers. This tactic, however, can prove disastrous for the boycotting parties. Lack of participation rarely nullifies election results and the distorted voting is likely to further detach boycotting groups from the organs of power, leaving them susceptible to political irrelevance.

Major instances of electoral boycotts

Boycott campaigns 
From 1868 into the 20th century, the Popes declared that  ("it is not expedient") that the Italian Catholics participate in the Italian parliamentary elections as either candidates or electors.

In South Africa, the three largest independent social movements boycott the vote under the banner of the No Land! No House! No Vote! Campaign.

Other social movements in other parts of the world also have similar campaigns or non-voting preferences. These include the Naxalites in India, the Zapatista Army of National Liberation in Mexico and various Anarchist oriented movements. In Mexico's mid term 2009 elections there was strong support for 'Nulo'—a campaign to vote for no one. In India poor people's movements in Singur, Nandigram and Lalgarh have rejected parliamentary politics (as well as the NGO and Maoist alternatives).

Outcome 
Analyzing the hybrid regimes in the period 1981-2006, the political scientist Ian O. Smith concluded that an election boycott by the opposition could increase the chances that the ruling party will lose future elections. Gregory Weeks noted that some authoritarian regimes in Latin America were prolonged due to the boycott of the opposition. Gail Buttorff and Douglas Dion explain that boycotts by the opposition under authoritarianism have led to different outcomes, sometimes predicting regime change and sometimes to make stronger the current government.

See also
 Abstention, an individual not voting
 Abstentionism, running in an election to a deliberative assembly but refusing to take any seats won

References 
 Notes

 Citations

Boycotts
Elections